Bantwal taluk is a taluk of Dakshina Kannada district. The headquarters is the town of Bantwal.

Geography of Dakshina Kannada district
Taluks of Karnataka